was a Japanese samurai of the Sengoku period, who served the Imagawa clan.

Early life 
He was born in 1479 or 1489, as the son of Ii Naouji, the lord of Iinoya castle. In 1507, he contributed three rice paddies to Jijōin, the family temple and the birthplace his ancestor, Ii Tomoyasu. Ii invited the priest Mokushū Zuien to Iinoho (Iinoya) and changed the temple name from Jijōin to Ryūtaiji.  In 1511, he gave productive land to Hohta Sukeshiro and communicated that to Hohta Negi.

Family
 Father: Ii Naouji
 Wife: Ihira Sadanao’s daughter
 Children:
 Ii Naomune by Ihira Sadanao’s daughter
 Ii Naomitsu by Ihira Sadanao’s daughter
 Ii Naoyoshi by Ihira Sadanao’s daughter
 Ii Naomoto
 Ihira Naoyasu
 daughter become Imagawa Yoshimoto’s concubine later married Sekiguchi Chikanga

Family 
His known daughter became the concubine of Imagawa Yoshimoto for a time before married Sekiguchi Chikanaga. She bore the famous Lady Tsukiyama, the first wife of Tokugawa Ieyasu, from that marriage.

His great-grandson Ii Naomasa was adopted by Ii Naotora, and became a feared general under Tokugawa Ieyasu who is considered one of his Four Guardians.

References 

Samurai
1479 births
1563 deaths
Ii clan